Karma 3 is the fifteenth mixtape by American rapper Dave East. It was released on August 14, 2020, via Mass Appeal, Def Jam Recordings and From the Dirt. Production was handled by several record producers, including AraabMuzik, Mike & Keys, DJ Paul, Dougie On The Beat, G Koop, Jake One, MP808, OGTha3, and Sap. It features guest appearances from Jozzy, A Boogie wit da Hoodie, Benny the Butcher, Bino Rideaux, Doe Boy, Mary J. Blige, Popcaan, Trey Songz, Trouble and Young Dolph. The album debuted at number 36 on the Billboard 200, and received acclaim from critics.

A deluxe version of the mixtape followed on October 23, 2020, with features from Dej Loaf, Junior Reid, Chris Brown and G Herbo, as well as the "Handsome" remix featuring Jeezy.

Critical reception

At Metacritic, which assigns a normalized rating out of 100 to reviews from mainstream publications, Karma 3 received an average score of 82 based on four reviews, indicating "universal acclaim".

AllMusic's Neil Z. Yeung said, "the album is very much substance over style, showcasing East's deft wordplay and storytelling talents without too many flashy distractions. On that end, Karma 3s production is robust and straightforward, evoking another time and place with old-school samples and head-nodding beats". Eero Holi of Clash said, "The tough guy act only gets you so far, though. And that is why 'Karma 3' really comes alive when East exposes his character's soft underbelly. ... Memories tainted by regret and guilt – the flip side of nostalgia – resonate in Motown-style acoustic instrumentation and chunky Golden Era beats combined with a supreme cast of vocalists". Will Lavin of NME said, "A charged effort with dynamic results, 'Karma 3' may not be as flawless a spectacle as Survival, but it's not all that far off. And it's definitely the best entry in the 'Karma' series. East remains consistent, unapologetically flying the flag for New York hip-hop". Eric Diep of HipHopDX said, "While Karma 3 isn't the show-stopping follow-up to Survival, East is still going to outwork any MC, dropping album after album until he's good and ready to hang up the mic".

Track listing

Charts

References

Sequel albums
Dave East albums
2020 mixtape albums
Albums produced by DJ Paul
Albums produced by Jake One
Albums produced by AraabMuzik
Albums produced by Sap (producer)
[[Category:Mass Appeal Records
albums]]